Jerome Osei Opoku (born 14 October 1998) is an English professional footballer who plays as a centre-back for Arouca.

Club career 
He captained the Fulham U23's at the end of the 2018–19 season.

On 2 September 2019, Opoku was sent on loan to League One side Accrington Stanley in order to gain first team experience. He made his Accrington debut against Bristol Rovers on 7 September 2019 in an eventual 3–3 draw. After a 3–1 defeat to Sunderland, in an interview he claimed he would play anywhere the coach put him.

On 25 September 2020, Opoku joined League One side Plymouth Argyle on loan until January. 

On 30 July 2021, Opoku was loaned out again, this time to Danish Superliga club Vejle Boldklub, for the entire 2021–22 season.

On 24 June 2022, Opoku joined Primeira Liga side Arouca on a free transfer.

Personal life
Born in England, Opoku is of Ghanaian descent. Brother of Jah-Nay Opoku

Career statistics

References

External links

1998 births
Living people
Footballers from Lambeth
English footballers
English expatriate footballers
English people of Ghanaian descent
Fulham F.C. players
Accrington Stanley F.C. players
Plymouth Argyle F.C. players
Vejle Boldklub players
English Football League players
Association football defenders
English expatriate sportspeople in Denmark
Expatriate men's footballers in Denmark
Black British sportsmen
F.C. Arouca players
Expatriate footballers in Portugal
English expatriate sportspeople in Portugal